Rick Pendleton, OAM (born 12 January 1985) is an Australian Paralympic swimmer from Sydney.  He represented Australia at the 2016 Rio de Janeiro Paralympics, his fourth Games.

Personal
He was born without his left hand. He turned to swimming after his rugby league career was ended by a knee ligament injury. He attended high school at Marcellin College Randwick. He is married to Jemma and they have a daughter Amara.

Career
He has won five Paralympic medals. He won a gold medal at the 2004 Athens Games in the 4×100 m medley 34pts event, and two gold medals in the 2008 Beijing Games, at the 4×100 m medley 34pts and 200 m individual medley SM10 events. At the 2006 IPC Swimming World Championships in Durban, South Africa he won a silver medal in the 200m individual medley and bronze in the 100m breaststroke.

In 2011, at the age of 26, he competed in the Can-Am Swimming Open, where he earned a gold medal in the S10 200m butterfly event, a silver medal in the men's SM10 200 m individual medley, and a  bronze in the 100m freestyle event.

Prior to the 2012 London Paralympics, he moved to the Sunshine Coast, Queensland to be coached by Jon Shaw. At the 2012 Summer Paralympics, he won a bronze medal in the 4×100 m medley relay 34pts and a bronze medal in the 200 m individual medley SM10.

Competing at the 2015 IPC Swimming World Championships in Glasgow, Scotland, he won a bronze medal in the 100 m breaststroke SB9. He finished fourth in the 4 × 100 m medley relay 34pts, fifth in the 200 m individual medley SM10, ninth in the 100 m butterfly S10 and eleventh in the 50 m freestyle S10.

He works as a swimming coach at Matthew Flinders Anglican College's Flinders Swim Club. In 2015, he was coached by Jan Cameron at the University of the Sunshine Coast.

At the 2016 Rio Paralympics Games, Pendleton competed in three events. He placed fifth in Men's 100m Breaststroke SB9 but didn't progress to the finals in Men's 100m Butterfly S10 and Men's 200m Individual Medley SM10.

Recognition
In 2009, he received a Medal of the Order of Australia for his 2008 gold medals. He was an Australian Institute of Sport paralympic swimming scholarship holder.

His philosophy is "It only takes a moment to lose, it takes a lifetime to forget. Even coal under pressure becomes a diamond."

References

External links
 
 
 

Male Paralympic swimmers of Australia
Swimmers at the 2004 Summer Paralympics
Swimmers at the 2008 Summer Paralympics
Swimmers at the 2012 Summer Paralympics
Swimmers at the 2016 Summer Paralympics
Medalists at the 2004 Summer Paralympics
Medalists at the 2008 Summer Paralympics
Medalists at the 2012 Summer Paralympics
Paralympic gold medalists for Australia
Paralympic bronze medalists for Australia
Recipients of the Medal of the Order of Australia
Australian Institute of Sport Paralympic swimmers
1985 births
Living people
S10-classified Paralympic swimmers
Medalists at the World Para Swimming Championships
Paralympic medalists in swimming
Australian male breaststroke swimmers
Australian male medley swimmers
21st-century Australian people